Megachile schmidti is a species of bee in the family Megachilidae. It was described by Heinrich Friese in 1917.

References

Schmidti
Insects described in 1917